Maria Aparecida Beruski, also known as Berushko, was a school teacher who died saving her students in a school fire in Brazil. She may become the first Orthodox saint in Latin America.

Maria, being of Ukrainian descent, was born in 1959, in Joaquim Távora, Paraná, Brazil.

When a school caught fire in 1986, Maria refused a chance to leave the building, instead she stayed inside and assisted her pupils in escaping. Beruski assisted in saving the lives of 5 children, but 8 children died together with the teacher in the fire.

The Synod of the Ukrainian Orthodox Church in Latin America already placed the issue of Maria's beatification to the agenda. It is expected the final decision to be made within three years.

A street in the Brazilian town of Curitiba has already been named after Beruski (Rua Maria Aparecida Beruski).

References

1959 births
1986 deaths
Brazilian people of Ukrainian descent
Brazilian educational theorists
People from Paraná (state)
People from Curitiba
20th-century Christian saints
Christian female saints of the Late Modern era
Eastern Orthodox Christians from Brazil
Members of Ukrainian Orthodox church bodies
Deaths from fire
Accidental deaths in Brazil